The Queen Mary School, founded in 1875, is a private school for girls in Grant road, Mumbai, India. It operates under the management of the Christian Medical Educational Fellowship (C.M.E.F) Trust and prepares students to take the Indian Certificate of Secondary Education (I.C.S.E) Board examinations. English is the medium of instruction throughout the school for all subjects, except the regional languages. It is among the oldest schools in Mumbai, and boasts, among its alumni prominent Indians like Maniben Patel (the daughter of Sardar Patel).

History
The Queen Mary School in Mumbai, India, was started in 1875 by the Zenana Bible and Medical Mission, an Anglican Mission, to provide education for girls. The school was called Queen Mary High School even though it had classes from Nursery (typically age 4) until the 11th standard (grade) which was equivalent to the "O" levels in Great Britain.

The monthly tuition fees were higher than the schools which taught in the local languages and the "convent" girls' schools run by nuns associated with Catholic societies. The medium of instruction was English and the examination papers for the 11th standard final school exams were set in Cambridge, England and initially were sent there for evaluation. Until about 1964, students were required to take both the Cambridge exams as well as the local SSC (Secondary School Certificate) exams.

Most of the teachers were of British origin who came to India under the auspices of the Mission to teach. These were gradually replaced by local Indian teachers, primarily Parsis, followed by other Indian ethnicities. All of the teachers were female with the exception of one elderly gentleman who taught Persian to the couple of girls whose parents wanted it for their daughters. The student body came from a range of income levels as the school subsidized the fees for certain students.

As it was a girls' school with all female teachers, there were a number of Muslim girls. In order to qualify for both the Cambridge and SSC exams, a range of subjects were offered. A choice of French, Sanskrit or Persian was mandatory from standards 5 though 8. For the latter, students had to elect courses either in the Sciences or the Arts in the 9th standard. There were other mandatory subjects like English (language)and Hindi. As per local state regulations, students had to pass the 9th standard Marathi or Gujarati exams, and the 10th standard History and Geography exams. Science subjects included Higher Mathematics, Physics, Chemistry and Biology. Arts subjects included English Literature, any of the languages, regular Mathematics, History, Geography, Physiology/Hygiene and Domestic Science. In addition, there was Physical Education. Extracurricular activities included dramatics, elocution, sports including swimming.

Girls have a choice of four houses named after famous women : Edith Cavell, Grace Darling, Joan of Arc and Florence Nightingale. Each girl had a school badge and a house badge (C, D, J, N). Sports, drama, elocutions and other contests were held between the houses. The school uniform was a white pinafore with three box pleats in the front and three in the back. Under that was worn a white button down blouse with short sleeves and a Peter Pan collar.

There were white laced canvas shoes and white socks. Many of the Indian girls had long hair which had to be braided into two braids or two short pony tails, single braids and pony tails were, and still are, not allowed

Even though the majority of the students were non-Christian, a Christian assembly was held mornings and evenings. Even though the Mission was established to achieve some level of conversion, there was no proselytising.

The first new wing in the late 1950s was built along the railway line with a new assembly hall and stage. The new science lab was in this building. In the 1960s, ZBMM was changed to BMMF (Bible Medical Missionary Fellowship) and the number of foreign teachers decreased.

The building started out as L-shaped with a junior and high school assembly hall/gymnasium. The foreign teachers lived on the second floor of the main wing and their dining room was below that together with the principal's office. There was a wide staircase leading to the main entrance. Students were not permitted to use that staircase and the whole wing was out of bounds.

Present
Queen Mary School is affiliated to the Council for the Indian School Certificate Examinations for the class 10 Board exams. Queen Mary School has a history of producing students who consistently score high grades at the standard 10 board exams called the Indian Certificate of Secondary Education. Batch sizes approximate 90 students divided into two sections. The uniform has undergone a lot of changes over the years, and is currently with a pink blouse and a black and white checked skirt with black sneakers. The school, house badge, and class badges are worn by every student, while prefects have additional badges

School song
In Bombay there is a School that I love,
Windswept and encircled by trees,
Midst roar of the traffic, yet towering above
As a beacon looks over the seas.
Her emblem's a rose, the queen of all flowers,
She's the best school of all, this dear School of ours!

Chorus:
Then here's to Queen Mary's, our School in Bombay,
We ne'er can forget her, we love her always,
We are proud of her past, she is famous today,
And here's to her future, Queen Mary's for aye!

The lessons we learn here, the plans that we make,
Successes and failures we have;
The guides and the houses, the games that we play,
The thought of them makes the heart glad.
The spirit of fellowship binding us all,
From dignified prefect, to K.G. girl small.

[Chorus]

Your hair may grow white and your step lose its spring,
Your girlhood be left far behind,
But through all the mists that the long years may bring,
One longing will 'ere fill your mind:
Once more to be under the kindly, mild rule,
Of the best school of all, Queen Mary's our school.

[Chorus]

Headmistresses
As time rolled by Queen Mary passed through the hands of many capable and dedicated principals, initially British nationals, and thereafter Indians. It had 10 British principals (headmistresses), Betty Shelton being the last British principal. Listed below is the list of the British principals

British Principals
Miss Harley
Miss Kimmins
Miss Kelsall
Miss Wilson
Miss Nixon
Miss Heather
Miss Bevis
Miss A. K. Groom
Miss A. E. Lambert
Miss B. R. Shelton

Indian Principals
The British Principals were followed by the First Indian Christian Principals, except for Mrs. R D. Wadia who was the only non-Christian principal and was appointed by the C.M.E.F. Trust headed by Dr. David. Miss G. Mathias is the current principal. 
Mrs. K. P. Rajhuns
Mrs. M. Poyyail
Mrs. N. David
Mrs. I. K. Soans
Mrs. M. Bharucha
Miss F. Gonsalves
Mrs. I. A. Aarons
Mrs. A. Sudhakar
Mrs. R. D. Wadia
Mrs. I Aarons
Miss G. Mathias

Notable alumni
Padmashri Shabana Azmi, actress, National award winner and Rajya Sabha MP
Shobhaa De, columnist, author, and publisher
Chandi Bathwala, Indian Representative at the U.N.
Nargis Dutt, the woman-in-white of the Indian cinema and former Chairperson of the Spastics Society of India
Dr. Armaity Desai, former Director of the Tata Institute of Social Services and former Chairperson of the University Grant Commission
Preeti Sagar, playback singer.
Rajni Iyer, Senior Counsel, Bombay High Court
Sharda Dwivendi, historian
Shaina NC, fashion designer
Soli P Godrej, Former Sheriff of Bombay
Sooni Taraporevala, international award winner for script writing Salaam Bombay and Mississippi Masala.
Aarti Chhabria, Actress
Ayra Cama, famous poet and writer
Devita Saraf, Founder of Vu Technologies and Co Founder of Vu TelePresence
Gautami Kapoor, Actress and model
Saryu Doshi, Padma Shri awardee
Sohrab Pirojsha Godrej, Former chairman of Godrej Group and Padma Bhushan awardee

References

External links

 https://web.archive.org/web/20060314201524/http://www.adam-matthew-publications.co.uk/collections_az/CMS-2-05/description.aspx

Primary schools in India
Catholic secondary schools in India
Christian schools in Maharashtra
Girls' schools in Maharashtra
High schools and secondary schools in Mumbai
Educational institutions established in 1875
1875 establishments in India